Shoulder pads are a piece of protective equipment used in many contact sports such as gridiron football, lacrosse, and ice hockey and some non-contact sports such as ringette. Most modern shoulder pads consist of a shock absorbing foam material with a hard plastic outer covering. The pieces are usually secured by rivets or strings that the user can tie to adjust the size.

History  

The first football shoulder pads were created by Princeton University student L.P. Smock in 1877. These were made of leather and wool and were thin, light, and did not provide much protection. In the early years of the 1900s decade, many young football players were killed while playing the sport due to the ferocity of the sport combined with the lack of sufficient protection. In 1905 President Theodore Roosevelt took the initiative to clean up the sport. He decried football as a dangerous sport and certain actions needed to be taken so that the sport could remain legal.  These shoulder pads were sewn into the players' jerseys rather than being worn as a separate piece of equipment.  Allegedly Pop Warner was the first to have his players wear shoulder pads. When he was coaching at the Carlisle Indian Industrial School, he was the first one to use pads made of fiber rather than cotton. The traditional, separate, over the head shoulder pads first made an appearance around 1910 to help make football a safer sport--these are the same style shoulder pads still used today. However, many players still did not use shoulder pads until the 1950s. In the 1960s, newer technology allowed companies to produce shoulder pads that were made of foam with an outer shell of hard plastic, offering improved protection when being hit. The drawback to these pads were that they did not have very much ventilation. Limited ventilation caused players to dehydrate quicker. This issue was fixed in the 1990s when synthetic fibers were added, making the shoulder pads more breathable.

See also
 Protective equipment in gridiron football
 American football

References

American football equipment
Armwear
Protective gear
Shoulder